École élémentaire Nouvel-Horizon is a French first language elementary school located in Welland, Ontario, Canada.

See also 
CSDCSO

External links 

Nouvel Horizon
Nouvel Horizon
Education in Welland